Laurent Brossoit (born March 23, 1993) is a Canadian professional ice hockey goaltender currently playing for the  Vegas Golden Knights of the National Hockey League (NHL). Brossoit was selected by the Calgary Flames in the sixth round, 164th overall, of the 2011 NHL Entry Draft and played for the Edmonton Oilers and Winnipeg Jets prior to joining the Golden Knights. He was born in Port Alberni, British Columbia, but grew up in Cloverdale, British Columbia.

Playing career

Amateur
In 2008, Brossoit was chosen in the second round, 26th overall, of the 2008 WHL Bantam Draft by the Edmonton Oil Kings. In the 2008–09 season, Brossoit played in 20 games for the Valley West Hawks of the BCMML. Brossoit saw his first Western Hockey League (WHL) action with the Oil Kings, playing one game.

During the 2009–10 season, Brossoit spent most of the season with the Cowichan Valley Capitals of the BCHL. In 21 games, Brossoit registered a 3.66 goals against average (GAA), a .901 save percentage and a 10–8–0 record. In five playoff games, he registered a 3.93 GAA and a .911 save percentage. Brossoit played in two games for the Oil Kings, posting a 2.80 GAA and a .944 save percentage. Brossoit played for Team Pacific at the 2010 World U-17 Hockey Challenge, posting a 2.00 GAA and a .902 save percentage in two games.

In his WHL rookie season, in 2010–11, Brossoit played in 34 games for the Oil Kings. He registered a 3.32 GAA and a .887 save percentage. In two playoff games, Brossoit posted a 3.58 GAA, a .875 save percentage and a 13–12–2 record.

In his second WHL, 2011–12, Brossoit was a workhorse for WHL champions Edmonton and helped guide the Oil Kings to a WHL championship and a berth into the 2012 Memorial Cup. He had a record of 42–13–5 with 3 shutouts in 61 games and posted a 2.47 GAA and .914 save percentage for the year. The Oil Kings finished with the WHL's best record in winning the Central Division and rolled through the playoffs. Brossoit was 16–4 with two shutouts and had a 2.04 GAA and .933 save percentage. He started all four games at the Memorial Cup and was 1–3 with a 4.04 GAA and .871 save percentage.

On April 2, 2013, Brossoit was named as Canadian Hockey League (CHL) Goaltender of the Week after posting a 4–1–0–0 record with two shutouts along with a 0.76 GAA and .968 save percentage in the opening round of the WHL Eastern Conference playoff series that saw the Oil Kings defeat the Kootenay Ice four games to one.

Professional
On April 4, 2013, the NHL's Calgary Flames signed Brossoit to an entry-level contract. Despite rumours of continuing his successful Memorial Cup season with the Flames for the end of the 2012–13 NHL season, Brossoit was not called-up.

On November 8, 2013, Brossoit was traded to the Edmonton Oilers. On March 24, 2014, after playing 30 games in the ECHL with the Bakersfield Condors and eight games in the American Hockey League (AHL) with the Oklahoma City Barons, Brossoit received his first NHL call-up to backup Oilers' starter Ben Scrivens.

On January 21, 2017, Brossoit earned his first NHL win in a game against the Calgary Flames.

After five seasons within the Oilers organization, Brossoit left as a free agent following the 2017–18 season. On July 1, 2018, he signed a one-year, two-way contract with the Winnipeg Jets. While playing with the Jets, Brossoit earned his first career NHL shutout in a 1–0 win over the Vancouver Canucks on December 22. He made 40 saves in the win.

On May 25, 2019, the Jets re-signed Brossoit to a one-year, $1.225 million contract. On October 2, 2020, the Jets re-signed Brossoit to a one-year, $1.5 million contract.

On July 28, 2021, following his third season with the Jets, Brossoit left as a free agent and was signed a two-year, $4.65 million contract with the Vegas Golden Knights.

Brossoit was waived by the Golden Knights on November 10, 2022; he cleared waivers the following day, and was assigned to Vegas' AHL affiliate, the Henderson Silver Knights.

Career statistics

Regular season and playoffs

Awards and honours

References

External links
 
 
 

1993 births
Living people
Abbotsford Heat players
Alaska Aces (ECHL) players
Bakersfield Condors (1998–2015) players
Bakersfield Condors players
Calgary Flames draft picks
Canadian ice hockey goaltenders
Cowichan Valley Capitals players
Edmonton Oil Kings players
Edmonton Oilers players
Henderson Silver Knights players
Ice hockey people from British Columbia
Oklahoma City Barons players
People from Port Alberni
Sportspeople from Surrey, British Columbia
Vegas Golden Knights players
Winnipeg Jets players